James Elliott Williams (November 13, 1930 – October 13, 1999) was an American law enforcement officer and honorary United States Navy chief boatswain's mate who was awarded the Medal of Honor during the Vietnam War. Boatswain's Mate First Class Williams was one of 32 Native Americans to receive the medal and is considered to be the most decorated enlisted man in the history of the United States Navy.

Early life
Williams was born in Fort Mill, South Carolina, and moved two months later with his parents to Darlington, South Carolina where he spent his early childhood and youth. He attended the local schools and graduated from St. John's high school.

Navy service
Williams enlisted in the United States Navy on August 8, 1947, at the age of 16, and completed basic training at Naval Training Center San Diego. He served for almost twenty years, retiring on April 26, 1967, as a boatswain's mate first class. During those years, he served in both the Korean War and Vietnam War. On May 14, 1968, Williams was presented the Medal of Honor by President Lyndon B. Johnson during the dedication ceremony of the "Hall of Heroes" in the Pentagon. In 1977, he received the honorary title of chief boatswain's mate.

During the Korean War, Williams served aboard the destroyer  from November 1950 to June 1952. He served off the coast of Korea where he was detached off the destroyer to take raiding parties into North Korea on small boats from March to June 1952.

Petty Officer Williams served aboard  from June 1960 through April 1963, reenlisting aboard Little Rock in April 1962.

In April 1966, with the enlisted rank of petty officer first class and the rating of boatswain's mate 1st class (BM1), Williams was assigned in May to the River Patrol Force, River Squadron Five, in command of River Patrol Boat 105 (PBR-105). The force's  mission was to intercept Viet Cong and People's Army of Vietnam arms shipments, supplies, and personnel on the waterways of South Vietnam's Mekong Delta and to keep innocent boat traffic on the river and canals safe.

On October 31, 1966, Williams was commanding PBR 105 alongside another PBR searching for Viet Cong guerrillas operating in an isolated area of the Mekong Delta. Suddenly, Viet Cong manning two sampans opened fire on the Americans. While Williams and his men neutralized one sampan, the other one escaped into a nearby canal. The PBRs gave chase and soon found themselves in a beehive of enemy activity as the VC opened fire on them with rocket propelled grenades and small arms from fortified river bank positions.

Williams repeatedly led the PBRs against concentrations of enemy junks and sampans. He also called for support from the heavily armed UH-1B Huey helicopters of HA(L)-3. When that help arrived, he kicked off another attack in the failing light. As a result of the three-hour battle, the U.S. naval force killed 1,000 Viet Cong guerrillas, destroyed over fifty vessels, and disrupted a major enemy logistic operation. For his actions on that date he was awarded the Medal of Honor.

U.S. Marshals Service
After retiring from the navy in April 1967, Williams worked for the Wackenhut Corporation. In 1969, he was appointed U.S. Marshal for the District of South Carolina, where he served until May 1977. He was then transferred to the Federal Law Enforcement Training Center, Glynco, Georgia, as an instructor and National Armorer. He was called back to South Carolina in July 1979 under court appointment as U.S. Marshal for South Carolina and served in that position until April 1980. He was then transferred to U.S. Marshals Service Headquarters, Washington, D. C., as Programs Manager, Health and Safety and In-District Training Officer where he served until his retirement from the U.S. Marshals Service with the grade of GS-1811-15.

Personal life
In 1949, Williams married the former Elaine Weaver and they had five children (daughter, Debbie, sons, James E. "Jr.", Stephen Michael, Charles E., and daughter, Gail) and seven grandchildren.

Death
Williams died on October 13, 1999; he was buried at the Florence National Cemetery in Florence, South Carolina.

Military awards
Williams' decorations and awards include:

 4 gold service stripes.

Medal of Honor citation

Navy Cross citation
Citation:

Other honors

 Navy Special Boat Unit 20 headquarters at Joint Expeditionary Base Little Creek-Fort Story, Virginia Beach, Virginia, was dedicated the BM1 James E. Williams Building in 1997.
 Navy guided missile destroyer  was named and christened in his honor on June 28, 2003, at Pascagoula, Mississippi.

See also

 List of Medal of Honor recipients
 List of Medal of Honor recipients for the Vietnam War

References

 
 
 
 

1930 births
1999 deaths
United States Navy non-commissioned officers
United States Navy personnel of the Korean War
United States Navy personnel of the Vietnam War
Vietnam War recipients of the Medal of Honor
United States Navy Medal of Honor recipients
Recipients of the Navy Cross (United States)
Recipients of the Silver Star
Recipients of the Legion of Merit
Recipients of the Navy and Marine Corps Medal
Recipients of the Gallantry Cross (Vietnam)
United States Marshals
People from Fort Mill, South Carolina